The Comedian's Comedian with Stuart Goldsmith is an interview podcast, in which Stuart Goldsmith interviews comedians about the craft of writing and performing standup comedy.

Guests on the show have included Russell Brand, Stewart Lee, and Patton Oswalt.

Some episodes have been recorded in the comedians' homes, or—in the case of Paul Sinha—in his car. Other episodes have been recorded live in front of an audience at theatres or festivals. The podcast is published on Soundcloud and iTunes, and syndicated on the British Comedy Guide.

It was nominated at the Chortle Awards for the Internet Award in 2013, 2014, and 2015.

Episodes

References

External links
 

Comedy and humor podcasts
Stand-up comedy
Audio podcasts
2012 podcast debuts